Conky may refer to:
 Conky (software), a computer software used for system monitoring
 Conky, a hand puppet used by Bubbles on Trailer Park Boys
 "Conky", an episode of Trailer Park Boys

See also
 Conky 2000, a robot on Pee-wee's Playhouse
 Conkey, a surname
 Konqi, the green dragon mascot for the KDE community